The St. Leger family (Latinized to De Sancto Leodegario) is an old Anglo-Irish family with Norman roots, that in some cases transformed into Selinger or Sellinger. It is first recorded in England as lord of the manor of Ulcombe in Kent. John St. Leger (died 1441) of Ulcombe was Sheriff of Kent in 1430.

History

The surname of St. Leger is recorded in several forms. This surname is originally toponymic in origin, indicating that the individual was from a location that had been dedicated to St. Leger. The name ultimately derives from the pre-7th-century Old German personal name Leodegar, composed of the elements liutr (tribe), and gari (spear). St. Leger, a 7th-century martyr and bishop of Autun, contributed to the popularity of the name in France, while in Germany the name was connected with a different saint, Ludger, an 8th-century bishop of Münster.

The name is first recorded in the Cartulary of Battle Abbey (Kent) in the early 12th century and in Pipe Rolls 1192 (Hampshire). The surname was introduced into Ireland in the 12th century following the Norman invasion of Ireland in 1169, where it achieved considerable status. Early examples of the surname recording include Sir Anthony de Saint Leger, Knight of the Order of the Garter who brought Ireland under the Crown. He served as Viceroy of Ireland for five terms. A plaque dedicated to Sir Anthony Saint Leger can be found in St George's Chapel, Windsor Castle.

William Ledger and Elizabeth May were married at St. Margarets, Westminster, London, on April 25, 1595. The first recorded spelling of the family name is possibly that of Adam Leger, which was dated 1279, in the Hundred Rolls of Cambridgeshire, during the reign of Edward I of England.

Several generations of St. Legers fought in the Crusades. Jean St. Leger (1160–1216) 'lived mainly on his French lands in Normandy whilst his brother Wizo cared for the lands at Fairlight in Sussex.  As a result of his feudal duties, he accompanied the French King Philip August on his conquest of Normandy, placed thus in a bad position, in reprisal the English King confiscated his English lands and arrested him on reconquering Normandy. Jean was held prisoner at Corfe Castle in Dorset for many years. The Barons revolt allowed the St. Leger family to offer ransom/release aided by the English Master Templar Roger St. Leger on 30 Aug 1216. Lord of Fairlight.'  A Jean de St. Leger, accompanied Robert, Duke of Normandy on the First Crusade 1096. Geoffrey De St. Leger fought with Richard I of England in Palestine from 1186 to 1201 or 1202. He was present at the siege of Acre in 1187. Ralph St. Leger, Lord of Ulcombe also took part in the siege of Acre in 1187. His tomb still exists in Ulcombe Church. He returned to England around 1201. Either he or his son of the same name As his son carried the same name was a signatory to Magna Carta in 1215.

Another Jean St. Leger was a Benedictine and Abbot of the Abbey of St. Wandrille, France, during the 14th century. Bishop Thomas St. Leger 1240–1320 was the Archdeacon of Kells around 1275 and is said to have raised money for the Crusades.

In 1377, Thomas St. Leger, (the second son of Sir Ralph St.Leger, of Ulcombe), who resided at Otterden, became the owner of East Hall Manor in Murston. His daughter was Joane, who then married Henry Aucher, esquire of Newenden.

Sir Thomas Saint Leger was a Knight of the Order of the Bath and Ambassador to France. He along with Louis XI and others signed the treaty of Pecquigny, ending the Hundred Years War. He married Anne of York, Duchess of Exeter. Upon Edward IV of England's death in 1483, St. Leger was beheaded by Richard III of England. He and Anne, who had died giving birth to their only child, Anne St. Legers, are buried in The Roos Chapel, St. George's Chapel, Windsor Castle. Their daughter married Sir George Manners, of the family of the Duke of Rutland. Their tomb (Sir George Manners) can be found in the Queen's private chapel in St. George's Chapel, Windsor.

Another St. Leger of historical importance was Gen. Anthony St. Leger. He was born in 1731, probably in Kildare, Ireland. He was one of a group of noblemen and gentlemen who in 1778 gathered for a private dinner party in an upper room of the Red Lion Inn, which stands in the market square in Doncaster. A horse race, which was to set the pattern for classic racing throughout the world, had been christened the St. Leger at the suggestion of Charles Watson-Wentworth, 2nd Marquess of Rockingham. The race, a sweepstake for three-year-olds, had been born two years earlier in 1776, at the suggestion of Lt. Col. (later Major-General) Anthony St. Leger, and ran for the first time over a two-mile course on Cantley Common in Doncaster. The classic race, The St. Leger, has been run at Doncaster ever since.  

Most St. Legers in the UK today descend from Sir Anthony St. Leger, KG of Ulcombe, Kent. The Viscounts Doneraile, whose seat was at Doneraile, Co. Cork, in Ireland, descend from Sir Anthony's first son, William, and the Heywards Hill branch of the family, also originally of Co. Cork, descend from his second son, Warham. (The account given in the "Peerage of Ireland" by John Lodge and Mervyn Archdal says that the first son William was disinherited due to his dissolute behaviour, and the second son Warham was made the heir. The first son William had a son also named Warham, who was killed in battle in 1600. The confusion in many family trees may have arisen from the assumption that the first son must have been the heir, as well as from the existence of several Warhams). Sir Anthony was married to Agnes Warham, niece and heiress of William Warham, Archbishop of Canterbury, after whom his first two sons were named. He was a courtier at the court of King Henry VIII and a lawyer of Lincoln's Inn. Commissioned by the King to devise a policy to bring Ireland under the Crown, Sir Anthony drew up and implemented the 'grant-re-grant' policy, whereby Irish chieftains handed over their lands to Henry and he granted them back with an English title.

In order to achieve their consent, Sir Anthony travelled to Ireland and met each chieftain to negotiate, albeit he sought them out in their forests and mountain fastnesses with a small posse of soldiers. He spent 13 months travelling through Ireland on this mission. In a letter to King Henry VIII from Kilmallock, Co. Limerick, in the far southwest of Ireland he wrote: "I think none of your Grace's Deputies cam this way this hundreth yeris since". Sir Anthony managed to persuade the majority of chieftains to accept this plan, but three great chieftains in the north of Ireland, O'Donnell, O'Neill and Maguire held out, sowing the historical seeds of the troubles to come. Modern Irish historians regard Sir Anthony as an English gentleman and a reasonable man.

Sir Anthony St. Leger served five terms as Lord Deputy in Ireland, and was granted Leeds Castle in Kent for his service to the King. His descendants from both Irish branches, Doneraile and Heywards Hill, are today scattered throughout the world.  Members of this ancient family now live in England, Ireland, France, South Africa, the US and elsewhere. There are now 2 bloodline Heywards Hill St Legers in Scotland for the first time since the Norman Invasion.

St. Legers in history
St. Legers of notable historical interest include:

Anthony St. Leger, served as Lord Deputy in Ireland for five terms (not three as previously stated); (1496–1559)
Sir William St. Leger, President of the province of Munster in Ireland (1586–1642)
 Sir John St Leger (1674-1743), judge of the Court of Exchequer (Ireland), father of Generals Anthony and Barry St Leger
Anthony St. Leger, soldier, British MP and founder of the St. Leger Stakes (1731–1786)
Colonel Barry St. Leger, British colonel involved in the American Revolutionary War (1737–1789); he was Anthony's brother 
Raymond St. Leger, entomologist, mycologist and college professor (born 1957)
Anthony St Leger (disambiguation), multiple people
Sean St Ledger, Central Defender for Leicester City
St Leger St Leger, 1st Viscount Doneraile  (d. 1787) Irish Member of Parliament for Doneraile
Frederick York St Leger, founder of the Cape Times
 Colonel Stratford Edward St Leger , Anglo-Boer War diarist and artist, World War I (1867–1935)
 The Hon. Elizabeth Aldworth, born Elizabeth St Leger, the first female Irish Freemason

References

Sources
Moya Frenz St. Leger, St. Leger The Family and the Race, 1986 , reprinted in 2004

External links

 Genealogy site
 Genealogy site
 Viscounts Doneraile – Cracroft's Peerage page

Saint Leger